Lac de Narlay is a lake in the Jura department of France.

Narlay